Five Points is an American teen drama web series that premiered on June 4, 2018 on Facebook Watch. The series was created and written by Adam Giaudrone and directed by Thomas Carter, both of whom also executive produce alongside Kerry Washington, Jon Avnet, Rodrigo García, and Jake Avnet. On December 13, 2018, it was announced that the series had been renewed for a second season. The second season premiered on August 5, 2019.

Premise
Five Points follows "five students at a South Side, Chicago high school who experience a life-changing event from different points of view, with each perspective being necessary to help understand the truth."

Cast and characters

Main

Hayley Kiyoko as Lexi Himitsu
Madison Pettis as Natasha "Tosh" Bennett
Shad Moss as Kevin Carson
Ray Cham Jr. as Cameron "CJ" Jin
Spence Moore II as Eric Harper (season 1)
Nathaniel Potvin as Wallace Marks
Jake Austin Walker as Alex Baker
Trey Curtis as Jonathan
Daniela Nieves as Ananda (season 2)

Recurring

Coco Jones as Jayla
Bryan Petty as Jock
Jahking Guillory as Ronnie Martin
Moe Irvin as Frank Bennett
Noah Weisberg as Mr. Delph
Milt Kogan as Mr. Saroyan
Hilary Ward as Detective Waters
Michael Broderick as Detective Shaw
James Black as Coach Magee
Matthew Hancock as Mr. Saunders
Kelly Sullivan as Victoria "Vickie" Bennett
Jordyn James as Mimi

Guest

Ani Sava as Mrs. Luisine ("And Yet Here We Are")
Matt Gottlieb as Gino ("And Yet Here We Are")
Jully Lee as Miss Kincaid ("Maybe I Like Eyeliner")
Troy Winbush as Paul Harper ("Top Of The Food Chain")
Jason Isaacs as Kenneth Himitsu ("We Started This")
Felice Heather Monteith as Barbara Baker ("Not Afraid Of Anything")

Episodes

Series overview

Season 1 (2018)

Season 2 (2019)

Production

Development
On October 17, 2017, Facebook announced that it had given the production a series order for a first season consisting of ten episodes. The series was created by Adam Giaudrone who is set to executive produce alongside Jon Avnet, Rodrigo García, Jake Avnet, Kerry Washington, Pilar Savone, and Thomas Carter. Giaudrone is also expected to act as a writer for the series as Carter is as a director. Production companies involved with the series include Simpson Street and Indigenous Media.

On January 9, 2018, Washington discussed the series at the annual Consumer Electronics Show in Las Vegas saying, "What I'm thrilled about is not only the content itself — the story, the acting, how its a shot." She continued, "There are some really important coming-of-age issues that we deal with. It's the LGBT community. It's gun violence. Drug use. Bullying." On May 16, 2018, it was announced that the series would premiere on June 4, 2018. On December 13, 2018, it was announced that the series had been renewed for a second season.

Casting
Alongside the series order announcement, it was confirmed that Madison Pettis and Hayley Kiyoko had been cast in the series' lead female roles. A month later, it was reported that Ray Cham Jr., Trey Curtis, Nathaniel Potvin, Jake Walker, and Spence Moore II had been added to the main cast.

Marketing
On January 30, 2018, Facebook released the first promotional video for the series. On May 16, 2018, the first official trailer for the series was released.

Reception

Critical response
In an overall positive review, Deciders Joel Keller recommended audiences stream the series saying, "Stream It, because the performances are good, the characters are well-drawn given the time constraints and the time commitment isn't that big. But don't expect a satisfying teen drama."

Viewership
In its first eight days of release, the first episode of the series garnered over two million views. However from episode one to episode three, viewership reportedly went down by more than 80%, dropping to 190,000 views.

References

External links

2010s American high school television series
2010s American teen drama television series
2018 American television series debuts
American teen drama web series
English-language television shows
Facebook Watch original programming
Television series about teenagers